Trevor Morley (born December 7, 1992) is an American soccer player.

Career

Youth, College and Amateur
Morley played his entire college career at Cal State Northridge.  In his five years with the Matadors, he made a total of 81 appearances and tallied 4 goals. He spent the 2011 season red-shirted.

He also played in the Premier Development League for FC Tucson in 2014.

Professional
On January 19, 2016, Morley was drafted by Portland Timbers with the final pick (81st overall) of the 2016 MLS SuperDraft. He signed with Portland's United Soccer League affiliate Portland Timbers 2 on March 1, 2016.

References

External links
T2 bio

1992 births
Living people
American soccer players
Association football defenders
Cal State Northridge Matadors men's soccer players
FC Tucson players
Portland Timbers draft picks
Portland Timbers 2 players
Soccer players from San Diego
USL Championship players
USL League Two players